The Time Traveller's Wife is a stage musical with a book by Lauren Gunderson and music and lyrics by Joss Stone and Dave Stewart (with additional lyrics by Kait Kerrigan and additional music by Nick Finlow), based on the novel by Audrey Niffenegger and the 2009 film.

Background 
A stage musical based on the book was announced to be in development in March 2021, which was due to premiere in the UK in late 2021 or early 2022. The musical is titled The Time Traveller's Wife (using the UK spelling of Traveler) and features a book by Lauren Gunderson music and lyrics by Joss Stone and Dave Stewart with additional lyrics by Kait Kerrigan. The production is directed by Bill Buckhurst and produced by Colin Ingram for InTheatre Productions by special arrangement with Warner Bros. Theatre Ventures.

In response to the announcement, Niffeneger revealed on Twitter she did not know about the project and then clarified that the theatrical rights belonged to Warner Bros.

Production history

World premiere: Chester (2022) 
The stage musical premiered at Storyhouse in Chester running from 30 September to 15 October 2022. The production was directed by Bill Buckhurst and designed by Anna Fleischle, with choreography by Shelley Maxwell, lighting design by Lucy Carter, illusions by Chris Fisher, video design by Andrzej Goulding, sound design by Richard Brooker, musical supervision & arrangement by Nick Finlow and orchestrations by Bryan Crook.

The cast included David Hunter as Henry with Joanna Woodward as Clare.

West End (2023) 
On 8 February 2023, it was announced that the production will transfer to the Apollo Theatre in London's West End from 7 October 2023 booking until 30 March 2024. Hunter and Woodward will reprise their roles as Henry and Clare, with further casting to be confirmed.

Cast and characters

External links 

 Official website

References 

2022 musicals
Musicals based on novels
West End musicals
Musicals based on films